Mateo Justis Briones (born January 11, 2005) is an English child actor. He recently portrayed the role of Junior Wheeler in Chucky, a television continuation of the Child's Play film franchise.

Early life
Briones was born in Oxford, England, on January 11, 2005, while his parents were on tour. He moved to Los Angeles at the age of 3. His father is Filipino actor/singer Jon Jon Briones and his mother is Irish and Swedish actress/talent agent Megan Briones. His older sister is actress/singer Isa Briones.

Career
Briones began acting and modeling at age five with his first credited film role being Alex Cabrera in the 2010 TV movie Cutthroat. He appeared in the Disney XD TV show Kickin' It in a 2011 episode as a young Jack. He appeared on Parks and Recreation in 2012 as Joey. In 2013, he appeared in an episode of the TV show Pretty Little Liars as Malcolm Cutler. Briones played the role of Casey in the 2017 film Wind River which starred Jeremy Renner and Elizabeth Olsen, Then he appeared again on Ratched on September 18 of 2020 which starred Sarah Paulson and Finn Wittrock. Briones played the role of Junior Wheeler in the first season of the TV series Chucky.

Filmography

Television

References

External links
 

American child actors
2005 births
21st-century American actors
21st-century English people
American male actors of Filipino descent
American people of Filipino descent
American people of Irish descent
American people of Swedish descent
Living people